Shipley's Adventure is a historic plantation home located in Cooksville and (Woodbine) Howard County, Maryland.

The house is the homestead of George Shipley, and Catherine Ogg and was part of the 1260 acre "Shipley's Adventure" land grant patented on 7 April 1761. In 1790, "Shipley's Enlargement" was added to the estate. The house is built around a 1761 log cabin containing a loft which windows have been added. In 1972 a family room was added to the "telescoping" building. The estate has been subdivided down to 16.53 acres by the 1970s with the Perilla family converting the agricultural land for wine making.

See also
Curtis-Shipley Farmstead

References

Cooksville, Maryland
Houses completed in 1761
Howard County, Maryland landmarks
Houses in Howard County, Maryland